Dobje is a small settlement in the Municipality of Grosuplje in central Slovenia. It lies in the hills north of the town of Grosuplje in the historical region of Lower Carniola. The municipality is now included in the Central Slovenia Statistical Region.

History
Dobje became an independent settlement in 1992, when it was administratively separated from Mala Stara Vas.

References

External links

Dobje on Geopedia

Populated places in the Municipality of Grosuplje